The Macau University of Science and Technology Football Field is a football stadium in Taipa, Macau, China. It is used mainly for Macau First Division Football League matches and athletics.

Notable events
 2005 East Asian Games
 2006 Hong Kong–Macau Interport

See also
 Sports in Macau

References

External links
Macau SAR Government Sports Institute
Macau University of Science and Technology

Football venues in Macau
Athletics (track and field) venues in Macau
Multi-purpose stadiums in Macau
2005 establishments in Macau
University sports venues in China